Labeo meroensis is fish in genus Labeo from the Nile River in Sudan.

References 

Endemic fauna of Sudan
Labeo
Fish described in 2007